Gordon Bayard McComb (February 21, 1917 – June 14, 2007) was an American professional basketball player. He played in the National Basketball League for the Hammond Ciesar All-Americans in two games and averaged 1.5 points per game.

References

1917 births
2007 deaths
United States Army personnel of World War II
American men's basketball players
Basketball players from Illinois
Chattanooga Mocs men's basketball players
Guards (basketball)
Hammond Ciesar All-Americans players
Military personnel from Illinois
People from Harvey, Illinois